Let's Take It to the Stage is the seventh album by American funk rock band Funkadelic. It was released in April 1975 on Westbound Records. The album charted at number 102 on the Billboard 200 and number 14 on the R&B Albums.

Music and lyrics 
Let's Take It to the Stage is a funk rock album. The opening track, "Good to Your Earhole", features extensive guitar parts and a pronounced funk groove played by the rhythm section. According to Funkadelic bandleader George Clinton, the guitar solo for "Get Off Your Ass and Jam" was performed by "a smack addict" guitar player who had found his way into the studio. He asked Clinton if he could play for some cash and proceeded to play "like he was possessed", soloing over the entire duration of the song. He received $50 for his efforts without Clinton ever learning his name. In a July 2009 interview with Vintage Guitar, guitarist Paul Warren said that he played the solo.

The closing track "Atmosphere", which begins with a monologue by Clinton about "dicks and clits", appropriates an extended organ coda from Johann Sebastian Bach. "Get Off Your Ass and Jam" has been sampled on several hip hop hits, including Brand Nubian's "Slow Down", Public Enemy's "Bring the Noise", and N.W.A's "100 Miles and Runnin'".

Critical reception 

Reviewing the album in 1975, Billboard magazine called it a collection of Funkadelic's "usual good mix of soul and jazz sounds, mixed in with singing and street raps", citing the title track and "Baby I Owe You Something Good" as highlights. In The Village Voice, Robert Christgau said Funkadelic finally does on record "what they've always promised to do in the hype—make the Ohio Players sound like the Mike Curb Congregation." Years later, he wrote in Christgau's Record Guide: Rock Albums of the Seventies (1981) that, despite the group's "disturbingly occultish bent", the music is "tough-minded, outlandish, very danceable, and finally, I think (and hope), liberating"; for Blender, he said it is their "tightest album ... all 10 tracks rock on."

In a retrospective review, AllMusic's Ned Raggett found Let's Take It to the Stage to be one of the band's most comical records with "more P-Funk all-time greats as well, making for a grand balance of the serious and silly." Sasha Frere-Jones, writing in The Rolling Stone Album Guide (2004), said it was "a summing-up of everything Funkadelic had done to date, and is still their most playable record." He felt that, although Clinton's "sexual politics weren't at their best" on tracks such as "No Head No Backstage Pass", the album is exemplary of the band's musicianship.

Track listing

"Good To Your Earhole" was sampled by Childish Gambino on the song "Riot".

Personnel
Vocals: 'Cool' Cal Simon, 'Bad Bosco' Bernie Worrell, C 'Boogie' Mosson, Garry 'Dowop' Shider
Bass Vocals: 'Sting' Ray Davis
Genie Vocals: 'Shady' Grady Thomas
Werewolf Vocals: Clarence "Fuzzy" Haskins
Maggot Overlord: George Clinton
Congas: Calvin Simon
Keyboards: Bernie Worrell
Bass: C Boogie Mosson
Percussion: R Tiki Fulwood
Guitar: Eddie Hazel, Michael Hampton, Garry Shider
Alumni Funkadelic: Bootsy Collins (vocals), Billy Bass, Eddie Hazel, Ron Bykowski
Guest Funkadelic: Paul Warren, Reggie McBride, Frosty [Barry Frost, drummer for Rare Earth], Mello Garcia, Honeys, Denise Hurd, Delores whats-her-name, Gary "Mudbone" Cooper, Parliament

References

Bibliography

External links
 
 "Masters of the Form: Funkadelic, 1975 – Let's Take It to the Stage" by PopMatters
 About the album

1975 albums
Westbound Records albums
Funkadelic albums
Albums with cover art by Pedro Bell